The first season of Your Face Sounds Familiar Kids was a singing and impersonation competition for celebrity kids on ABS-CBN. It is the first season of the kids version of the said competition. Gary Valenciano and Sharon Cuneta reprise their former duties, however this time, along with new jury Ogie Alcasid, who replaced Jed Madela for the third season. Billy Crawford also return as a host.

After 14 weeks, Awra Briguela emerged as the winner, garnering 95.41% of the public's votes.

YFSF Kids 1 returned to air on March 21, 2020. However, the reruns were abruptly stopped after May 3, 2020, due to the temporary closure of ABS-CBN following the cease and desist order issued by the National Telecommunications Commission on account of its franchise expiration.

Development
On August 15, 2016, Crawford announced that it will return for a third season; which was later revealed as the Kids edition entitled Your Face Sounds Familiar Kids.

On November 22, 2016, Ogie Alcasid, who made a comeback on ABS-CBN, was revealed as the newest addition to the show's judges, replacing Madela. The Kids season premiered on January 7, 2017, taking over the time slot vacated of the then-recently concluded  Pinoy Boyband Superstar, whose timeslot was temporarily filled by the Kapamilya Weekend Specials movie block.

On March 21, 2020, the show returned on air as part of the network's Luzon lockdown special programming, temporarily replacing the ongoing season of The Voice Teens until the temporary closure of ABS-CBN following the cease and desist order issued by the National Telecommunications Commission on account of its franchise expiration.

Prize
Every week, the winner will win a cash prize of 100,000 pesos, half will be given to his or her chosen charity. The grand prize is 1 million pesos, ticket for 4 at South Korea and house and lot.

Host, Judges and Mentors

Host
Billy Crawford serves as the host of the local kids version of Your Face Sounds Familiar.

Judges
The judges, dubbed as "The Jury" in the show:

The Jury
 Ogie Alcasid
 Sharon Cuneta
 Gary Valenciano

Mentors
Annie Quintos of The Company served as the mentor for vocals while Georcelle Dapat of the G-Force served as the mentor for choreography and movement.

Performers
The following are participating performers for the competition. They were revealed during the ABS-CBN Trade Launch on November 22, 2016.

 AC Bonifacio – Dancer (Dance Sweetheart)
 Alonzo Muhlach – Child actor (Bibong Child Wonder)
 Awra Briguela – Child actor (Breakout Child Star)
 Elha Nympha – Singer (Big Shot Belter)
 Justin Alva – Singer (Musikerong Charmer)
 Lyca Gairanod – Singer (Young Diva ng Masa)
 Sam Shoaf – Singer (Talented Cutie)
 Xia Vigor – Child actress (Daytime Princess)

Results summary
The table below shows the corresponding points earned each week. Unlike in the regular seasons, points are called stars instead, and instead of giving 3 points to other performers, the jury gives 4 stars to the lower ranked contestants.

Legend

Performances

Week 1 (January 7 & 8)
Non-competition performance
 Ogie Alcasid as Annie - "Tomorrow"
Episode hashtag
 #YFSFKids (Saturday)
 #YFSFCuties (Sunday)

Week 2 (January 14 & 15)
Episode hashtag
 #YFSFCutenessOverload (Saturday)
 #YFSFAmazingKids (Sunday)

Week 3 (January 21 & 22)
Episode hashtag
 #YFSFSuperKids (Saturday)
 #YFSFKidSensation (Sunday)

Week 4 (January 28 & 29)
Episode hashtag
 #YFSFTalentedKids (Saturday)
 #YFSFWonderKids (Sunday)

Week 5 (February 4 & 5)
Episode hashtag
 #YFSFAwesomeKids (Saturday)
 #YFSFPhenomenalKids (Sunday)

Week 6 (February 11 & 12)
Episode hashtag
 #YFSFUnbeatableKids (Saturday)
 #ILoveYFSFKids (Sunday)

Week 7 (February 18 & 19)
Episode hashtag
 #YFSFKidsRule (Saturday)
 #YFSFAdorableKids (Sunday)

Week 8 (February 25 & 26)
Episode hashtag
 #YFSFExceptionalKids (Saturday)
 #YFSFWowKids (Sunday)

Week 9 (March 4 & 5)
Episode hashtag
 #YFSFKulitKids (Saturday)
 #YFSFLovableKids (Sunday)

Week 10 (March 11 & 12)
Episode hashtag
 #YFSFBestKids (Saturday)
 #YFSFUnkabogableKids (Sunday)

Week 11 (March 18 & 19)
Episode hashtag
 #YFSFGiftedKids (Saturday)
 #YFSFIncredibleKids (Sunday)

Week 12 (March 25 & 26)
Episode hashtag
 #YFSFTrendingKids (Saturday)
 #YFSFUnstoppableKids (Sunday)

Week 13 (April 1 & 2) 
Episode hashtag
 #YFSFFantasticKids (Saturday)
 #YFSFKidsGrandFinalists (Sunday)

Finals: Week 14 (April 8 & 9) 
The finale was held in Newport Performing Arts Theater, Resorts World Manila. All eight contestants were chosen to compete for the grand prize.
Non-competition performances
 Sharon Cuneta & Frankie Pangilinan - "I-Swing Mo Ako"
 Ogie Alcasid & Leila Alcasid - "Sumayaw, Sumunod"
 Gary Valenciano & Kiana Valenciano - "Mahal Na Mahal Ko Siya"
 Daniel Padilla & Kathryn Bernardo - "Can't Help Falling In Love"
Episode hashtag
 #YFSFKidsGrandShowdown (Saturday)
 #YFSFKidsGrandWinner (Sunday)

Television ratings

References

External links
 Your Face Sounds Familiar Kids on ABS-CBN

Your Face Sounds Familiar (Philippine TV series)
2017 Philippine television seasons